Five ships of the Royal Navy have borne the name HMS Griffin, after the legendary creature, the Griffin:

  was a 12-gun Royalist ship, captured by the Parliamentarians in 1655. She foundered in 1664.
  was an 8-gun fireship launched in 1690, rebuilt in 1702 and sold in 1737.
  was a 44-gun fifth rate, previously the French Griffon. She was captured in 1712 and restored to France in 1713.
  was a 12-gun cutter purchased in 1778 and sold in 1786. Under the command of Lieutenant Inglis, she captured a French privateer brig of sixteen 6-pounder guns on about 21 May 1779.
  was a G-class destroyer launched in 1935. She was transferred to the Royal Canadian Navy in 1943 and renamed , and was sold in 1946.

See also
 
 Hired armed cutter

citations and references

 

Royal Navy ship names